Hamid Barole Abdu (born October 10, 1953, in Asmara) is an Eritrean writer.

After studying literature in Eritrea, he moved to Modena, Italy, in 1974, where he has worked as an intercultural expert and has published several articles about the migratory phenomenon.

Works 
 Hamid Barole Abdu. Eritrea: una cultura da salvare. Ufficio Stampa del Comune di Reggio Emilia, 1986.
 Hamid Barole Abdu. Akhria - io sradicato poeta per fame. Reggio Emilia, Libreria del Teatro, 1996.
 Hamid Barole Abdu. Sogni ed incubi di un clandestino. Udine, AIET, 2001. .
 Hamid Barole Abdu. Seppellite la mia pelle in Africa. Modena, Artestampa, 2006. .
 Hamid Barole Abdu. Il volo di Mohammed. Faenza (RA), Artestampa, 2009. .
 Hamid Barole Abdu. Rinnoversi in segni ... erranti. Faenza (RA), GraficLine, 2013.
 Hamid Barole Abdu. Poems across the pearl of Africa. Faenza (RA), GraficLine, 2015.

References

External links 
  Io sradicato poeta per fame: sito personale

1953 births
Living people
Eritrean poets
People from Asmara
Eritrean male writers
Male poets
20th-century poets
21st-century poets
20th-century male writers
21st-century male writers